Joseph Fischer (24 February 1909 – 6 June 1986) was a Luxembourgian footballer. Fischer made his debut for Luxembourg, aged 15 years 7 months and 11 days. He later competed in the men's tournament at the 1936 Summer Olympics.

References

External links
 
 

1909 births
1986 deaths
Luxembourgian footballers
Luxembourg international footballers
Olympic footballers of Luxembourg
Footballers at the 1936 Summer Olympics
People from Hesperange
Association football defenders